Marco Cimatti (13 February 191? – 21 May 1982) was an Italian cyclist who won a gold medal in the team pursuit at the 1932 Olympics. In 1934, he turned professional and won three stages of the 1937 Giro d'Italia and the opening stage of the 1938 Giro. In 1937, he founded a small company named Cimatti, which initially produced bicycles, but in the 1950s–60s changed to mopeds and motorcycles. His son Enrico later expanded the business to export motorcycles to the United States, France, Norway and Tunisia.

References

1982 deaths
Italian male cyclists
Olympic cyclists of Italy
Cyclists at the 1932 Summer Olympics
Olympic gold medalists for Italy
Olympic medalists in cycling
Cyclists from Bologna
Medalists at the 1932 Summer Olympics
Italian Giro d'Italia stage winners
1910s births
Italian track cyclists